Cavidabad (also, Cavadabad, Dzhavidabad, and Dzhavudabad) is a village in the Babek District of the Nakhchivan Autonomous Republic of Azerbaijan.

References 

Populated places in Babek District